Basant Bhatt is an Indian actor who appears in television serials. He made his television debut in the series Arjun where he played the role of a school boy Varun.

Filmography

Television

References

External links
 
 

Year of birth missing (living people)
Living people
Indian male television actors